Yotchiangrai (also called Yot Chiang Rai, Phraya Yot Chiang Ra and Yot Mueang) was the thirteenth monarch of the Mangrai Dynasty that ruled Lan Na in what is now northern Thailand.  He ruled between 1487 and 1495. He was a son of Thao (Prince) Bunrueang, the only son of King Tilokaraj who had been executed by his grandfather on suspicion of disloyalty.  He ruled from the death of his grandfather until he abdicated in favour of his son in 1495.

References

Rulers of Chiang Mai
15th-century monarchs in Asia
Year of birth unknown
Year of death unknown